MOB Lashkar Gah is a former International Security Assistance Force (ISAF) Main Operating Base located in Lashkargah District, Helmand Province, Afghanistan.

The base was formerly used by Task Force Helmand HQ until 9 August 2013 and was controlled under Operation Herrick (OP H). The base was handed over to the ANSF on 24 February 2014 and has seen been divided up.

History

It has been used by:
 Operation Herrick 4 – 16 Air Assault Brigade (May 2006 – November 2006).
 Lashkar Gah PRT
 Operation Herrick 5 – 3 Commando Brigade HQ (November 2006 – April 2007).
 Operation Herrick 6 – 12th Mechanized Brigade HQ (April 2007 – October 2007).
 Operation Herrick 7 – 52nd Infantry Brigade HQ (October 2007 – April 2008).
 Operation Herrick 8 – 16 Air Assault Brigade HQ (April 2008 – October 2008).
 Operation Herrick 9 – 3 Commando Brigade HQ (October 2008 – April 2009).
 Operation Herrick 10 – 19th Light Brigade HQ (April 2009 – October 2009).
 Operation Herrick 11 – 11 Light Brigade HQ (October 2009 – April 2010).
 Operation Herrick 12 – 4th Mechanized Brigade HQ (April 2010 – October 2010).
 Operation Herrick 13 – 16 Air Assault Brigade HQ (October 2010 – April 2011).
 Operation Herrick 14 – 3 Commando Brigade HQ (April 2011 – October 2011).
 Operation Herrick 15 – 20th Armoured Brigade HQ (October 2011 – April 2012).
 Operation Herrick 16 – 12th Mechanized Brigade HQ (April 2012 – October 2012).
 Operation Herrick 17 – 4th Mechanized Brigade HQ (October 2012 – April 2013).
 Operation Herrick 18 – 1st Mechanized Brigade HQ (April 2013 – October 2013).
 Operation Herrick 19 – 2nd Battalion, Royal Anglian Regiment  (October 2013 – 24 February 2014).

The base was handed over to the ANSF on 24 February 2014.

Current use

The base is currently used by the ANSF.

See also
 List of ISAF installations in Afghanistan
 Operation Herrick order of battle

References

War in Afghanistan (2001–2021)
Military bases of the United Kingdom in Afghanistan
2006 establishments in Afghanistan
2006 in the United Kingdom